Ormayil Nee Maathram is a 1979 Indian Malayalam-language film,  directed by J. Sasikumar and produced by R. Devarajan. The film stars Prem Nazir, Seema, Sathar and Reena in the lead roles. The film has musical score by G. Devarajan.

Cast
Prem Nazir as Suresh
Jayabharathi as Shanthi
Sathar as Babu
Priyamvada as Sreedevi
Sudheesh as Chandhran

Soundtrack
The music was composed by G. Devarajan with lyrics by Yusufali Kechery.

References

External links
 

1979 films
1970s Malayalam-language films
Films directed by J. Sasikumar